Henry Jackson Yue (born Yue Ah Hee in 1881–1955) was a notable New Zealand teacher, translator and consul. He was born in Roxburgh, Central Otago, New Zealand in 1881.

References

1881 births
1955 deaths
New Zealand schoolteachers
New Zealand people of Chinese descent
New Zealand translators
People from Roxburgh, New Zealand
20th-century translators
New Zealand educators